Staroselye is a rural locality (a selo) in Mikhaylovka Urban Okrug, Volgograd Oblast, Russia. The population was 1,001 as of 2010. There are 23 streets.

Geography 
Staroselye is located 17 km south of Mikhaylovka. Mikhaylovka is the nearest rural locality.

References 

Rural localities in Mikhaylovka urban okrug